Rudolph McCoy-Pantoja Jr. (born July 20, 1964) is an American perennial political candidate and resident of Seattle, Washington. He became an internet meme due to a 2016 viral video of him jokingly identifying as "Hugh Mungus".

The "Hugh Mungus" incident 
On August 10, 2016, Pantoja spoke at a public meeting of the Seattle City Council in support of a new police station in the North Precinct, crediting the police with helping his daughter obtain treatment for addiction to heroin.

At the meeting, activist Zarna Joshi claimed that media coverage of the event chose to interview Pantoja and not any of the activists protesting the meeting or speaking against it. Joshi argued that this was out of a desire for footage of a person of colour speaking in support of the station, accusing the news media of tokenism. After the meeting, Joshi encountered Pantoja outside of City Council chambers as she was videotaping. He approached her, offered to give his name, and proceeded to offer the gag name "Hugh Mungus." Joshi responded by asking "Humongous what?" and grew agitated when he did not respond. She eventually asked if he had meant it as sexual harassment, and when he continued not to respond, she began accusing him of sexual harassment, pursuing him with her camera, and ultimately ending up in an altercation with the authorities present. The video gained particular notoriety online following a reaction video posted by YouTube channel h3h3Productions.

Community activities 
Pantoja chose not to take part in the Great American Boycott on May 1, 2006. He instead was seen sweeping a sidewalk in the Ballard neighborhood of Seattle.

Following the 2012 Packers–Seahawks officiating controversy, Pantoja attempted to exchange gifts with Green Bay, Wisconsin mayor Jim Schmitt. After Schmitt's office refused the gifts, Pantoja exchanged gifts with Delavan, Wisconsin mayor Mel Nieuwenhuis. Pantoja sent local beer, smoked salmon and kringles to Nieuwenhuis. In return Nieuwenhuis planned to send a "six or 12-pack of Miller High Life, cheese and fresh venison he hunted himself."

Pantoja supports Everett-based charity Hope Soldiers, an organization that aims to help people struggling with addiction and depression off the streets.

A gardener by profession, he ran for Washington House of Representatives in 1994, 1996, and 2002. He ran for Seattle City Council Position 8 in 2017, and he opposed a local income tax, arguing that "it would have to be determined statewide".

In May 2019, Pantoja attended a public safety forum about neighborhood crime held by Seattle Mayor Jenny Durkan.

Pantoja has been working as a landscaper and garden designer in the Seattle Area since the 1990s, and has said he has installed stone paths, waterfalls, and fountains.

Personal life 
Pantoja is of Mexican, German and Native American descent and considers himself to be Chicano. A GoFundMe campaign started by Ethan Klein of h3h3Productions in November 2016 raised $155,000 for him after he faced several health problems. Klein originally set up a YouCaring campaign, but it was shut down. Some of the problems he faced were a hip replacement, his truck breaking down, and being served an eviction notice.

Pantoja is a grandfather and mentioned his daughter had previously struggled from opiate addiction until he was able to get her into a recovery program, and Pantoja himself was also in recovery from alcoholism.

Pantoja lives in Crown Hill. Pantoja also starred in the Ballard High School short film Richard.

Electoral history

References 

1964 births
Living people
American gardeners
American people of German descent
American politicians of Mexican descent
American people who self-identify as being of Native American descent
Internet memes
Politicians from Seattle
Washington (state) Republicans